Brennan of the Moor is a 1913 American silent short drama film on the life of the Irish highwayman Willy Brennan, directed by Edward Warren and produced by the Solax Studios. It was distributed by Exclusive Supply Corporation.

Print held by the Library of Congress.

Cast
Barney Gilmore as Brennan of the Moor
Marian Swayne as Lady Betty
Joseph Levering as Lt. Hume

References

External links

View incomplete print of film at silentera.com (Dutch intertitles)

1913 films
American silent short films
American black-and-white films
1913 short films
1913 drama films
Silent American drama films
1910s American films
American drama short films
1910s English-language films